William Dobbie CBE (1878 – 19 January 1950) was a British Labour politician.

Dobbie was born in Maybole, Ayrshire. When he was just two-years-old, his parents, Francis Dobbie and Agnes McCreath, died there leaving two young sons, William and his brother James aged six. James remained in Maybole with his maternal grandparents while William was raised in Glasgow by his aunt.

Dobbie became a railway employee and moved to York and became a councillor in 1911.  He became active in the General Railway Workers' Union, and was its president in 1913, when it became part of the National Union of Railwaymen (NUR).  During World War I, he served in the British Army and was wounded. After the war he became an alderman of York and in 1923 was elected Lord Mayor of York, the first Labour mayor of the city. He was President of the NUR from 1925 to 1927 and 1931–1933.

Dobbie stood for Parliament without success for Barkston Ash in 1924 and Clitheroe in 1929 before being elected Member of Parliament (MP) for Rotherham in a by-election in 1933. In 1936, during the Spanish Civil War, Dobbie visited the Alcazar, a military academy under siege by Republican troops.  Willie Forrest, who arrived in a chauffeur-driven Rolls-Royce requisitioned from a Royalist nobleman said of the occasion, "I took William Dobbie, a visiting Labour MP, up a church tower from which you get a wonderful view of the Alcazar's courtyard.  There was a machine-gun in the tower and Dobbie couldn't resist the temptation to fire it at the fascists."  William Dobbie later served a second term as Lord Mayor in 1947 and in the same year was made a CBE (it is said he refused a knighthood), remaining a Member of Parliament until his death.

References

External links 
 

1878 births
1950 deaths
Councillors in North Yorkshire
Labour Party (UK) MPs for English constituencies
UK MPs 1931–1935
UK MPs 1935–1945
UK MPs 1945–1950
Commanders of the Order of the British Empire
British Army personnel of World War I
Lord Mayors of York
National Union of Railwaymen-sponsored MPs
Presidents of the National Union of Railwaymen